Faun is a German band that was formed in 1998 and plays pagan folk, darkwave, and medieval music. The originality of their music style is that it falls back to "old" instruments, and the singing is always the center of attention. The vocals are performed in a variety of languages, including German, English, Latin, Greek, and Scandinavian languages. Their instruments include Celtic harp, Swedish nyckelharpa, hurdy-gurdy, bagpipes, cittern, flutes, and many others.

History

The band was founded in 1998 by Oliver s. Tyr, Elisabeth Pawelke, Fiona Rüggeberg, and Birgit Muggenthaler. Two years later, Rüdiger Maul joined the band as a percussionist. At the same time, Birgit left the band to continue her musical life with the folk-rock band Schandmaul. In 2002, they released their first album Zaubersprüche. Niel Mitra was a guest musician on this album, and he later became a full-time member of the band, the only one playing only electronic instruments.

In 2003, the band released its second album, Licht, and performed at several festivals in support of this music.

Elisabeth Pawelke left Faun in 2008 to focus on her studies in classical song in Basel, Switzerland. She was succeeded by Sandra Elflein, who left Faun in April 2010 due to a pregnancy and health issues. Singer and multi-instrumentalist Rairda replaced her but left the band in 2012. She was succeeded by Katja Moslehner.

In 2013, the band toured Europe, including Berlin. Later that year, they published their seventh studio album Von den Elben, which became the first Faun album to reach top ten positions in the album charts of Germany, Austria, and Switzerland, and was also their first album to chart in the latter two countries. It was nominated for the ECHO award in the categories 'National Rock/Pop Group' and 'National Newcomer of the Year'.

On 19 August 2016, the band released an album called Midgard. It quickly reached third place in the German album ranking. The following year, Katja Moslehner left the band. She was replaced by Laura Fella. 

On 15 November 2019, the band released Märchen & Mythen, their tenth studio album.

In 2020, founding member Fiona Frewert announced her departure from the band. She was replaced by singer-songwriter Adaya.

After five albums released by Universal Music Germany, Faun established their own record label in 2021, Pagan Folk Records. The first album to be released on this label is Faun's Pagan, set for April 2022.

Style

Music

Faun is a prime example of "Mittelalter" music, a German musical style mixing Medieval folk and folk metal. To express their own bond with nature the band coined the term "Pagan Folk" for one style of their concerts. While the term was initially used for electronically amplified concerts only, it is now used by fans and band for their music itself. A quote by Oliver Pade reveals another possibility for having chosen this specific term: "We don't know ourselves what kind of music we play, so we call it paganfolk" (Oliver Pade 2004 in a song announcement at the 2004 Summer Darkness in Utrecht, Netherlands). The Münchner Merkur defines it as "a sometimes experimental mix of folk elements, medieval and traditional music from different epochs and regions as well as modern, even electronic influences".

Faun's repertoire ranges from melancholic ballads to exuberant dances like the Brittanic An Dro. Thereby they set historical tunes from various periods and regions to music and on the other hand create a lot of their own compositions as well.

Faun combines ancient Perso-Arab melodies with the Swedish nyckelharpa and Middle High German lyrics. Equally distinguishing are Pawelke's and Rüggeberg's singing, mostly in two voices and, on newer recordings, the driving beat by Niel Mitra. Mitra has described the essence of the band as a form of "musical alchemy", due to the different musical interests of the members and how they are combined in Faun's music.

The debut album Zaubersprüche deals mainly with slow ballads from the era between the Late Middle Ages and Romanticism. The instrumentation is kept entirely acoustic and waives modern instruments and electronic beats. The second album features far less ballads but offers considerably more danceable tunes like Andro, Unda or the double song Deva/Punagra.

Lyrics

The lyrics originate from very different languages, Standard German, Middle High German, Old Icelandic, Low German, Old Norse, Latin, Hungarian, Finnish, and Ladino among them. Among lyrics of their own, the group uses or writes lyrics inspired by classical texts such as the Carmina Burana ("Satyros", "Renaissance"), the Cantigas de Santa Maria ("Da que Deus", "Renaissance"), Jenaer Liederhandschrift from Vitslav III, Prince of Rügen ("Loibere Risen", "Renaissance"), Egils Saga ("Licht"), the Poetic Edda ("Sigurdlied", "Buch der Balladen"), Heinrich von Morungen ("Von den Elben", "Licht"), the ballad King Henry, as well as from romantic and modern authors such as John Keats ("Der Wilde Wasermann", "Buch der Balladen"), Baron Munchausen ("2 Falken", "Totem" and "Jahrtausendalt", "Buch der Balladen"), José Melchor Gomis ("Tinta", "Totem"), Joseph Freiherr von Eichendorff ("Der stille Grund", "Totem"), Felicitas Kukuck ("Tanz über die Brücke", Buch der Balladen") and others.

Faun seek to promote a form of paganism they characterise as nature religion. They are however not hostile to Christian culture and are open to performing Christian songs. They have stressed that many Christian traditions have a pagan origin or pagan components. Oliver s. Tyr has said that he is opposed to the church, but regards Christianity as a good religion and thinks it is better to be a Christian than to have no faith at all.

Meaning of the name

The name Faun comes from ancient Greek-Roman mythology, where it equals the herders' deity Faunus or Pan. According to the band, this figure which is often also depicted as a natural or forestal spirit, shall express the members' connection with nature. For the same reason Oliver Pade's pseudonym is the Satyr, who is closely related to Faunus.

Members

Oliver s. Tyr – vocals, bouzouki, nyckelharpa, Celtic harp, jaw harp
Rüdiger Maul – tar, riq, davul, panriqello, darabukka, timbau, gaxixi and many other percussion instruments
Niel Mitra – sequencer, sampler, synthesizer, FL Studio, Buzz, Logic Audio, tascam us 224, boss dr 202, Korg Alpha, granular synthesis, folder synthesis, feedbacks, sounds taken from nature and everyday life
Stephan Groth – vocals, hurdy-gurdy, flutes, cittern 
Laura Fella – vocals, Framedrum, Mandola 
Adaya – vocals, bagpipes, flutes, pandora, celtic harp, bouzouki

Former members
Elisabeth Pawelke – vocals, hurdy-gurdy 
Birgit Muggenthaler – whistles, bagpipes, shawm, vocals 
Sandra Elflein – vocals, violin, hurdy-gurdy 
Rairda – vocals, harp, flutes, percussion instruments, hurdy-gurdy 
Sonja Drakulich – vocals, dulcimer, percussion instruments 
Katja Moslehner – vocals, percussion instruments 
Fiona Frewert (born Rüggeberg) – vocals, recorders, whistles, bagpipes, seljefloyte

Discography

Studio albums

— denotes an album that did not chart

The band feature as guest musicians on several tracks of the 2009 Mediæval Bæbes album Illumination.

Live albums
FAUN & The Pagan Folk Festival – Live feat. Sieben & In Gowan Ring (2008)

DVD
Lichtbilder (DVD, 2004)
Ornament (DVD, 2008)

References

External links

German musical groups
Musical groups established in 1998
Pagan-folk musicians
2002 establishments in Germany
Polydor Records artists
Modern pagan musical groups
Modern paganism in Germany